Petalophyllaceae is a family of liverworts in the order Fossombroniales.  Most species are thallose; that is, the plant is not differentiated into root, stem, and leaf. The thallus is typically small and bears lamellae on its dorsal surface that give it a ruffled, leafy appearance.

The family includes two extant genera, Petalophyllum and Sewardiella.

References

Fossombroniales
Liverwort families